John Nicholas "Dick" Foran (June 18, 1910 – August 10, 1979) was an American actor, known for his performances in Western musicals and for playing supporting roles in dramatic pictures.

Early years
Foran was born in Flemington, New Jersey, the first of five sons to Arthur F. Foran and Elizabeth Foran. His father was a Republican member of the New Jersey Senate, as was Dick Foran's younger brother, Walter E. Foran.

He attended Mercersburg Academy, where he competed on the track team under Scots-American athletics coach Jimmy Curran. After graduation he attended the Hun School, a college preparatory school in nearby Princeton, and then enrolled at Princeton University, pursuing a degree in geology. He played on the football team while taking courses in the arts, where he developed an interest in the theater.

Foran studied music at the Leibling Studio in New York before singing on radio. As Nick Foran, he went on to become a lead singer with a band and later formed his own orchestra.

Film 

Foran was still billed as Nick Foran when he signed a contract with Fox in 1934. In 1935, Foran, who stood 6-foot-2 and had red hair, was hired by Warner Bros. as a supporting actor, changing his first name to Dick. He could also croon when called upon in films such as Change of Heart (1934) with Janet Gaynor, made for Fox Film Corporation. His handsome appearance and good-natured personality made him a natural choice for the supporting cast. He first appeared as a singing cowboy in his first starring role, in Moonlight on the Prairie (1935). His other singing-cowboy features included Song of the Saddle (1936), Guns of the Pecos (1937), Empty Holsters (1937), and Cowboy from Brooklyn (1938). He appeared in dozens of movies of every type during his lengthy career, often with top stars leading the cast.

In 1938, Foran moved to Universal Studios, where he acted in many different genres of film from horror to comedies with Abbott and Costello, such as Ride 'Em Cowboy (1942).  Foran appeared in The Petrified Forest (1936) with Bette Davis and Humphrey Bogart, The Sisters (1938) with Errol Flynn and Bette Davis, The Fighting 69th (1940) with James Cagney, My Little Chickadee (1940) with Mae West and W.C. Fields, and Rangers of Fortune (1940) with Fred MacMurray, and played the top-billed hero in The Mummy's Hand (1940) with Tom Tyler as the Mummy. Foran reprised the same role in the sequel The Mummy's Tomb (1942), this time with Lon Chaney Jr. as the Mummy, and had also appeared in another comedy with Bud Abbott and Lou Costello titled Keep 'Em Flying (1941) the previous year. In 1942, Foran starred as Lon Prentice, a singing cowboy who joins the army in a 68-minute war-support film, Private Buckaroo with Harry James, the Andrews Sisters, and Shemp Howard.

One of his last film roles was a small one in Donovan's Reef (1963), starring his longtime friend John Wayne and Lee Marvin. His final film appearance was as the prospector "Old Timer" in the sentimental film Brighty of the Grand Canyon (1967) with Joseph Cotten, Pat Conway, and Karl Swenson.

Stage 
In 1943, Foran starred on Broadway in the Rodgers and Hart musical comedy A Connecticut Yankee, based on Mark Twain's A Connecticut Yankee in King Arthur's Court.

Television 
In 1954, Foran guest-starred on NBC's Justice, a legal drama starring Dane Clark and Gary Merrill, on CBS's The Public Defender starring Reed Hadley and Hugh Beaumont, and on NBC's The Martha Raye Show, a comedy/variety show.

Foran appeared in at least four episodes of Science Fiction Theatre (1955).  One of these, "The Miracle Hour", aired December 22, 1956. Foran appeared three times (1955–1956) as Father Brophy on the ABC anthology series Crossroads. He guest-starred in the syndicated crime drama Sheriff of Cochise starring John Bromfield.  He also appeared as Burt, a carnival hustler, in 1957 on NBC's Father Knows Best with Robert Young.

Foran was prominently featured as a sheriff in the episode "The Third Rider" in the first season (1957) of the ABC/Warner Bros. Western series Maverick starring Jack Kelly as Bart Maverick, the brother of James Garner's character Bret Maverick. He also portrayed Tuck Degan in the 1957 episode "Final Payment" of another ABC/WB Western series, Colt .45 starring Wayde Preston. 
 
In the January 1959 episode  "The Spurs", he portrayed Sheriff Wilkes on Wanted Dead or Alive starring Steve McQueen. He made another guest appearance in the December 1960 episode: "The Choice", portraying aging bounty hunter Frank Koster. Also in 1959, Foran portrayed defendant Dr. David Craig on CBS's Perry Mason in the episode "The Case of the Bedeviled Doctor". Later that year, he played defendant Steve Benton in another Perry Mason episode, "The Case of the Garrulous Gambler".  He was also featured as Perry Mason's client in the 1961 episode "The Case of the Renegade Refugee".  In 1959, Foran was cast as David Steele in the episode "The Adjuster" of the NBC crime drama series Richard Diamond, Private Detective, starring David Janssen.  Dabbs Greer and DeForest Kelley also appeared in this episode.

In 1962, Foran appeared with Marie Windsor in the roles of Frank and Ann Jesse in the episode "The Wanted Man" of the ABC/WB Western series Lawman, starring John Russell as Marshal Dan Troop.

Foran later appeared as Gabriel Marion, brother of title character Francis Marion (Leslie Nielsen), in the Walt Disney Presents miniseries The Swamp Fox.  In 1965–1966, he had his only regular role on a TV series playing "Slim" on O.K. Crackerby!.  In 1968, Foran was cast in the role of "Fred Haines" in season one, episode 13, of the NBC television series Adam-12.

Death 
On August 10, 1979, Foran died aged 69 of respiratory ailments and pneumonia in Burbank, California. He was buried in the San Fernando Mission Cemetery.

Recognition 
Foran has a star on the Hollywood Walk of Fame for his contribution to television, at 1600 Vine Street. It was dedicated on February 8, 1960.

Selected filmography

 Stand Up and Cheer! (1934) as Nick Foran
 Change of Heart (1934) as Nick
 Student Tour (1934) as Assistant Manager (uncredited)
 Gentlemen Are Born (1934) as Smudge Casey
 The Lottery Lover (1935) as Cadet
 One More Spring (1935) as Park Policeman
 It's a Small World (1935) as Cop
 Farmer Takes a Wife (1935) as Walt Lansing (uncredited)
 Accent of Youth (1935) as Butch
 Ladies Love Danger (1935) as Sergeant Bender
 Shipmates Forever (1935) as Gifford
 Moonlight on the Prairie (1935) as Ace Andrews
 Dangerous (1935) as Teddy
 The Petrified Forest (1936) as Boze Hertzlinger
 Song of the Saddle (1936) as Frank Wilson Jr. aka The Singing Kid
 Treachery Rides the Range (1936) as Captain Red Taylor
 The Golden Arrow (1936) as Tommy Blake
 The Big Noise (1936) as Don Andrews
 Public Enemy's Wife (1936) as Thomas Duncan McKay
 Earthworm Tractors (1936) as Emmet McManus
 Trailin' West (1936) as Lieutenant Red Colton
 California Mail (1936) as Bill Harkins
 Guns of the Pecos (1937) as Steve Ainslee
 Black Legion (1937) as Ed Jackson
 Land Beyond the Law (1937) as John 'Chip' Douglas Jr.
 The Cherokee Strip (1937) as Dick Hudson
 Blazing Sixes (1937) as Red Barton
 Empty Holsters (1937) as Clay Brent
 The Devil's Saddle Legion (1937) as Tal Holladay
 Prairie Thunder (1937) as Rod Farrell
 The Perfect Specimen (1937) as Jink Carter
 She Loved a Fireman (1937) as James 'Red' Tyler
 Love, Honor and Behave (1938) as Pete Martin
 Over the Wall (1938) as Jerry Davis
 Cowboy from Brooklyn (1938) as Sam Thorne
 Four Daughters (1938) as Ernest
 Boy Meets Girl (1938) as Larry Toms
 The Sisters (1938) as Tom Knivel
 Secrets of a Nurse (1938) as Lee Burke
 Heart of the North (1938) as Sergeant Alan Baker
 Inside Information (1939) as Danny Blake
 Daughters Courageous (1939) as Eddie Moore
 I Stole a Million (1939) as Paul Carver
 Hero for a Day (1939) as Brainy Thornton
 Private Detective (1939) as Jim Rickey
 Four Wives (1939) as Ernest Talbot
 The Fighting 69th (1940) as Lt. 'Long John' Wynn
 My Little Chickadee (1940) as Wayne Carter
 The House of Seven Gables (1940) as Matthew Holgrave
 Winners of the West (1940, Serial) as Jeff Ramsay
 Rangers of Fortune (1940) as Johnny Cash
 The Mummy's Hand (1940) as Steve Banning
 Four Mothers (1941) as Ernest Talbot
 Horror Island (1941) as Bill Martin
 In the Navy (1941) as Dynamite Dugan
 Riders of Death Valley (1941) as Jim Benton
 Unfinished Business (1941) as Frank
 The Kid from Kansas (1941) as Kansas
 Mob Town (1941) as Sgt. Frank Conroy
 Keep 'Em Flying (1941) as Jinx Roberts
 Road Agent (1941) as Duke Masters
 Ride 'Em Cowboy (1942) as Bronco Bob Mitchell
 Butch Minds the Baby (1942) as Dennis Devlin
 Private Buckaroo (1942) as Lon Prentice
 The Mummy's Tomb (1942) as Stephen Banning
 Behind the Eight Ball (1942) as Bill Edwards
 Hi, Buddy (1943) as Dave O'Connor
 He's My Guy (1943) as Van Moore
 Guest Wife (1945) as Christopher Price
 Easy Come, Easy Go (1947) as Dale Whipple
 Fort Apache (1948) as Sgt. Quincannon
 El Paso (1949) as Sheriff La Farge
 Deputy Marshall (1949) as Joel Benton / Jed Northey
 Al Jennings of Oklahoma (1951) as Frank Jennings
 Treasure of Ruby Hills (1955) as Alan Doran
 Please Murder Me (1956) as Joe Leeds
 Sierra Stranger (1957) as Bert Gaines
 Chicago Confidential (1957) as Arthur 'Artie' Blane
 Violent Road (aka Hell's Highway)  (1958) as Frank 'Sarge' Miller
 Thundering Jets (1958) as Lt. Col. Henry Spalding
 The Fearmakers (1958) as Jim McGinnis
 The Atomic Submarine (1959) as Cmdr. Dan Wendover
 The Big Night (1960) as Ed
 Studs Lonigan (1960) as Patrick Lonigan
 Lassie as the fire chief Ed Washburne (TV series, 7 episodes, 1961–64)
 Donovan's Reef (1963) as Australian Navy Officer Sean O'Brien
 Taggart (1964) as Adam Stark
 Brighty of the Grand Canyon (1966) as Old Timer, the Prospector

Selected television

References

External links

 
 
 
 "Dick Foran, 'The Singing Cowboy'", The Old Corral

1910 births
1979 deaths
Male Western (genre) film actors
American male film actors
American male television actors
Singing cowboys
People from Flemington, New Jersey
Burials at San Fernando Mission Cemetery
Male actors from Los Angeles
20th-century American male actors
Male actors from New Jersey
Singers from New Jersey
20th-century American singers
20th-century American male singers